Port Royal Bay is located in the western end of Horseshoe Bay in Bermuda.

References
 

Bays of Bermuda
Southampton Parish, Bermuda